Antonio Garrido Monteagudo (September 26, 1887 – February 15, 1967), better known as Antonio Moreno or Tony Moreno, was a Spanish-born American actor and film director of the silent film era and through the 1950s.

Early life and silent films
Born in Madrid, Spain, Moreno emigrated to New York in 1901 and settled in Massachusetts, where he completed his education. Although he claimed to have attended Williston Seminary in Easthampton, Massachusetts, the Archives of the school, now the Williston Northampton School, have no record of his having done so.  He became a stage actor in regional theater productions. In 1912, he moved to Hollywood, California, where he was signed to Biograph Studios, and began his career in bit parts. His film debut was in Iola's Promise (1912).

In 1914, Moreno began co-starring in a series of highly successful serials at Vitagraph opposite popular silent film actress Norma Talmadge. These appearances increased Moreno's popularity with nascent filmgoers, and by 1915, he was a highly regarded matinee idol, appearing with successful actors such as Tyrone Power, Sr., Gloria Swanson, Blanche Sweet, Pola Negri, and Dorothy Gish. Moreno often was typecast in his early films as the "Latin Lover". These roles predate Rudolph Valentino's breakthrough as a "Latin Lover" in the 1921 film The Four Horsemen of the Apocalypse.

By the early 1920s, Moreno joined film mogul Jesse Lasky's Famous Players and became one of the company's highly paid performers. In 1926, Moreno starred opposite Swedish acting legend Greta Garbo in The Temptress, and the following year, he had a starring role in the enormous box-office hit It with Clara Bow.

Sound films
With the advent of sound films in the late 1920s and early 1930s, Moreno's career began to falter, in part because of his heavy Spanish accent. While still acting in English language films, Moreno began taking parts in Mexican films. During the early 1930s, Moreno directed several well-received Mexican films, including the 1932 drama Santa, which has been hailed by film critics as one of the best Mexican films of the era. By the mid-1930s, he began rebuilding his faltering Hollywood career by taking notable roles as a character actor. By the mid-1940s and throughout the 1950s, Moreno appeared in a number of well-received roles, most notably, his 1954 role in the classic horror film Creature from the Black Lagoon and his 1955 role as Emilio Figueroa in film director John Ford's epic The Searchers.

Personal life 
On January 27, 1923, Moreno married American heiress Daisy Emma Canfield in Los Angeles, California. They moved to an estate known as Crestmount. The union lasted 10 years and ended shortly before she was killed in an automobile accident on February 23, 1933.

Death and legacy
Moreno died at his home in Beverly Hills, California, on February 15, 1967, aged 79. He was buried at Forest Lawn Memorial Park cemetery in Glendale, California. His film career spanned more than four decades. In 1994, the Mexican magazine Somos published its list of "The 100 best movies of the cinema of Mexico" in its 100th edition and named the 1931 Moreno directed Santa its 67th choice. 

For his contribution to the motion picture industry, Antonio Moreno was given a star on the Hollywood Walk of Fame at 6651 Hollywood Blvd., Hollywood, California.

Selected filmography

 Iola's Promise (1912, Short) as An Indian (uncredited)
 The Voice of the Millions (1912, Short) as One of the Strike Leaders
 His Own Fault (1912) as In Gambling Hall 
 An Unseen Enemy (1912, Short) as On Bridge (uncredited)
 Two Daughters of Eve (1912, Short) as An Actor / At Stage Door
 So Near, Yet So Far (1912, Short) as In Club
 The Musketeers of Pig Alley (1912, Short) as Musketeers Gang Member / At Dance (uncredited)
 Oil and Water (1913, Short) as Actor in Play (uncredited)
 A Misunderstood Boy (1913, Short) as Vigilante (uncredited)
 No Place for Father (1913, Short) as The Son
 A Cure for Suffragettes (1913, Short)
 By Man's Law (1913, Short) as Procurer / Slaver
 The House of Discord (1913, Short) as The Sister-in-Law's Sweetheart
 Judith of Bethulia (1914) as Extra
 Strongheart (1914, Short) as Frank Nelson
 Too Many Husbands (1914, Short) as Harry Brown
 The Accomplished Mrs. Thompson (1914, Short) as Dick Osborne
 The Ladies' War (1914) as Mr. Blenkinsop
 The Persistent Mr. Prince (1914, Short) as Prunella's Brother
 Fogg's Millions (1914, Short)
 The Song of the Ghetto (1914, Short) as Mario Amato - the Composer
 John Rance, Gentleman (1914, Short) as Dr. John Rance
 Men and Women (1914, Short) as Man in Kirke's Office (uncredited)
 Memories in Men's Souls (1914, Short) as Graham's Son
 The Hidden Letters (1914, Short) as John Reynolds
 Politics and the Press (1914, Short) as John Marsden - the Newspaper Editor
 The Loan Shark King (1914, Short) as Harry Graham
 The Peacemaker (1914, Short) as Jack Strong
 Under False Colors (1914, Short) as Pvt. Jack Warring
 Goodbye Summer (1914, Short) as Hugo St. Clair - the Artist
 The Old Flute Player (1914, Short) as John Vanderlyn
 Sunshine and Shadows (1914, Short)
 His Father's House (1914)
 In the Latin Quarter (1915, Short) as Andrew Lenique
 The Island of Regeneration (1915) as John Charnock Jr
 The Quality of Mercy (1915, Short) as Bratton Powers - Van Cortland's Personal Secretary
 The Park Honeymooners (1915, Short) as Billy - the Young Husband
 Love's Way (1915, Short) as Rand Cornwall
 The Dust of Egypt (1915) as Geoffrey Lascelles
 Youth (1915, Short) as Harold Harcourt - Sculptor
 Anselo Lee (1915) as Anselo Lee
 The Gypsy Trail (1915, Short) as Willie Buckland - a Gypsy
 A 'Model' Wife (1915, Short) as Robert Blake
 A Price for Folly (1915) as M. Jean de Segni
 On Her Wedding Night (1915) as Henry Hallam
 Kennedy Square (1916) as Harry Rutter
 The Supreme Temptation (1916) as Herbert Dubois
 Susie, the Sleuth (1916, Short) as Hank Handy
 She Won the Prize (1916, Short) as Charles Adams - a Young Businessman
 The Shop Girl (1916) as Peter Rolls
 The Tarantula (1916) as Pedro Mendoza
 The Devil's Prize (1916) as Hugh Roland
 Rose of the South (1916) as Dick Randolph
 Her Right to Live (1917) as John Oxmore
 Money Magic (1917) as Ben Fordyce
 Aladdin from Broadway (1917) as Jack Stanton
 Captain of the Gray Horse Troop (1917) as Capt. George Curtis
 The Magnificent Meddler (1917) as Montague Emerson
 A Son of the Hills (1917) as Sandy Morley
 By Right of Possession (1917) as Tom Baxter
 The Angel Factory (1917) as David Darrow
 The Mark of Cain (1917) as Kane Langdon
 Sylvia of the Secret Service (1917) as Undetermined Secondary Role (uncredited)
 The Naulahka (1918) as Nicholas Tarvin
 The House of Hate (1918) as Harvey 'Harry' Gresham
 The First Law (1918) as Hugh Godwin
 The Iron Test (1918) as Albert Beresford
 Perils of Thunder Mountain (1919) as John Davis
 The Invisible Hand (1920) as John 'The Needle' Sharpe
 The Veiled Mystery (1920) as Ralph Moore
 Three Sevens (1921) as Daniel Craig
 The Secret of the Hills (1921) as Guy Fenton
 A Guilty Conscience (1921) as Gilbert Thurstan
 My American Wife (1922) as Manuel La Tessa
 Lost and Found on a South Sea Island (1923) as Lloyd Warren
 Look Your Best (1923) as Carlo Bruni
 The Trail of the Lonesome Pine (1923) as John Hale
 The Exciters (1923) as Pierre Martel
 The Spanish Dancer (1923) as Don Cesar de Bazan
 Flaming Barriers (1924) as Sam Barton
 Bluff (1924) as Robert Fitzmaurice
 Tiger Love (1924) as The Wildcat
 The Border Legion (1924) as Jim Cleve
 The Story Without a Name (1924) as Alan Holt
 Hello, 'Frisco (1924) as Himself
 Learning to Love (1925) as Scott Warner
 Her Husband's Secret (1925) as Elliot Owen
 One Year to Live (1925) as Captain Tom Kendrick
 Mare Nostrum (1926) as Ulysses Ferragut
 Beverly of Graustark (1926) as Dantan
 The Temptress (1926) as Manuel Robledo
 Love's Blindness (1926) as Hubert Culverdale, 8th Earl of St. Austel
 The Flaming Forest (1926) as Sergeant David Carrigan
 It (1927) as Cyrus T. Waltham
 Venus of Venice (1927) as Kenneth Wilson
 Madame Pompadour (1927) as Rene Laval
 Come to My House (1927) as Floyd Bennings
 The Whip Woman (1928) as Count Michael Ferenzi
 Nameless Men (1928) as Robert Strong
 The Midnight Taxi (1928) as Tony Driscoll
 Adoration (1928) as Prince Serge Orloff
 Synthetic Sin (1929) as Donald Anthony
 The Air Legion (1929) as Steve Rogers
 Careers (1929) as Victor Gromaire
 Romance of the Rio Grande (1929) as Juan
 El cuerpo del delito (1930) as Harry Gray
 Rough Romance (1930) as Loup La Tour
 El hombre malo (1930) as Pancho Lopez
 One Mad Kiss (1930) as Don Estrada
 El precio de un beso (1930) as Estrada
 La Voluntad del muerto (1930) as Pablo
 Los que danzan (1930) as Daniel Hogan / Frank 'Cicatriz' Turner
 Primavera en otoño (1933) as Enrique
 La ciudad de cartón (1934) as Fred Collins
 Señora casada necesita marido (1935) as Tomás Karen
 Asegure a su mujer (1935) as Eduardo Martin
 Storm Over the Andes (1935) as Maj. Tovar Rojas
 Rosa de Francia (1935) as Felipe V
 Alas sobre El Chaco (1935) as Comandante Manuel Tovar
 The Bohemian Girl (1936) as Devilshoof
 Rose of the Rio Grande (1938) as Captain Lugo
 Ambush (1939) as Captain Mike Gonzalez
 María de la O (1939) as Pedro Lucas / Mr More
 Seven Sinners (1940) as Rubio
 They Met in Argentina (1941) as Don Carlos, 100 Peso Donor (uncredited)
 The Kid from Kansas (1941) as Chief of Police (uncredited)
 Two Latins from Manhattan (1941) as Cuban
 Fiesta (1941) as Don Hernandez - Cholita's Uncle
 Valley of the Sun (1942) as Chief Cochise
 Undercover Man (1942) as Don Tomas Gonzales
 Tampico (1944) as Justice of the Peace (uncredited)
 The Spanish Main (1945) as Commandante
 Sol y sombra (1946) as Manuel Campos
 Notorious (1946) as Senor Ortiza (uncredited)
 Captain from Castile (1947) as Don Francisco De Vargas
 Lust for Gold (1949) as Ramon Peralta (uncredited)
 Crisis (1950) as Dr. Emilio Nierra (uncredited)
 Saddle Tramp (1950) as Martinez
 Dallas (1950) as Don Felipe Robles
 The Mark of the Renegade (1951) as Jose De Vasquez
 Thunder Bay (1953) as Dominique Rigaud
 Wings of the Hawk (1953) as Father Perez
 Creature from the Black Lagoon (1954) as Carl Maia
 Entre barracas (1954)
 Saskatchewan (1954) as Chief Dark Cloud
 The Searchers (1956) as Emilio Gabriel Fernandez y Figueroa
 Catch Me If You Can (1959)

References

Bibliography
 "Antonio Moreno," The Clearfield Progress, August 26, 1920, page 15.
 "Antonio Moreno, Silent-Film Star," The New York Times, February 16, 1967.
 Bodeen, Dewitt.  "Antonio Moreno," Films in Review, June–July, 1967.
 Menefee, David W.  The First Male Stars: Men of the Silent Era.  Albany: Bear Manor Media, 2007.
 "Public Pleased by Vitagraph’s Move to Return Antonio Moreno to Feature Films," The Moving Picture World. New York: Chalmers Publishing Company. December 25, 1920.
 Virginia, Violet.  "Antonio Moreno of the Vitagraph Players," Motion Picture Magazine, December 1914. Pages 103-105.

External links

 Antonio Moreno at Silents Are Golden
Some contemporary articles and interviews with Antonio Moreno
Photographs and literature

1887 births
1967 deaths
Williston Northampton School alumni
American male film actors
American male silent film actors
Spanish male film actors
Spanish male silent film actors
20th-century Spanish male actors
Male Western (genre) film actors
Male actors from Madrid
Spanish emigrants to the United States
20th-century American male actors
Burials at Forest Lawn Memorial Park (Glendale)